Susan or Sue Webber may refer to:

 Susan Webber (politician), American politician in the Montana House of Representatives
 Susan Webber, creator of Naked Capitalism
 Susan Webber Wright (born 1948), aka Susan Webber Carter, U.S. district judge
 Susan Wessels-Webber (born 1977), South African field hockey player

See also
Susan Weber (disambiguation)